The old Posta del Chuy is a historic inn situated  away from Melo, Cerro Largo, Uruguay.

History

The inn was intended for travelers going by diligence from Melo to Villa Artigas (now Río Branco).

Built in 1855 by two Basque men named Etcheverry, the solid stone building is unique in South America.

Heritage

It has been declared a site of National Heritage. The history of its construction is described in "Los árboles de piedra" by Andrés Echevarría.

References

External links

 360 images from Posta del Chuy
 Blog post about Posta del Chuy

History museums in Uruguay
Buildings and structures in Cerro Largo Department
Tourist attractions in Uruguay